Ergaki (Russian: Ергаки) is a mountain range in the Western Sayan Mountains in southern Siberia, Russia.

The highest point is peak Zvyozdniy (2265 meters).

Ergaki Nature Park is a protected area which contains the mountain range.

References

External links 

Mountain ranges of Russia
Landforms of Krasnoyarsk Krai
Sayan Mountains